The Women's team sprint event of the FIS Nordic World Ski Championships 2017 was held on 26 February 2017.

Results

Semifinals
The semifinals were started at 11:30.

Semifinal A

Semifinal B

Final
The final was started at 13:30.

References

Women's team sprint
2017 in Finnish women's sport